Eoophyla euryxantha is a moth in the family Crambidae. It was described by Edward Meyrick in 1936. It is found in the Republic of the Congo and the Democratic Republic of the Congo.

The wingspan is 13–17 mm. The base of the forewings is dull fuscous and the subbasal area is white. The median area of the wing is ochrous and there is a white costal strigula, suffused with pale fuscous. The base of the hindwings is white with an ochreous median fascia edged with fuscous. The postmedian area is white, suffused with silver-grey scales.

References

Eoophyla
Moths described in 1936